Bedford County is a United States county located in the Piedmont region of the Commonwealth of Virginia.  Its county seat is the town of Bedford, which was an independent city from 1968 until rejoining the county in 2013.

Bedford County was created in 1753 from parts of Lunenburg County, and several changes in alignment were made until the present borders were established in 1786. The county was named in honor of John Russell, an English statesman and fourth Duke of Bedford.

Bedford County is part of the Lynchburg Metropolitan Statistical Area. As of the 2020 census, Bedford's population was 79,462. The county population has more than doubled since 1980.

History 

The Piedmont area had long been inhabited by indigenous peoples.  At the time of European encounter, mostly Siouan-speaking tribes lived in this area.

Bedford County was established by European Americans on December 13, 1753 from parts of Lunenburg County. Later in 1756, a portion of Albemarle County lying south of the James River was added.  The county is named for John Russell, the fourth Duke of Bedford, who was a Secretary of State of Great Britain. In 1782, Campbell County was formed from eastern Bedford County and the county seat was moved from New London to Liberty (now Bedford). Also in 1786, the portion of Bedford County south of the Staunton (Roanoke) River was taken with part of Henry County to form Franklin County.

The town of Bedford became an independent city in 1968, and remained the county seat. On September 14, 2011, the Bedford City Council voted to transition into a town and end its independent city status. The supervisors of Bedford County also voted to accept the town of Bedford as part of the county when it lost city status. The town of Bedford once more became part of Bedford County on July 1, 2013.

Geography

Adjacent counties and city 

Rockbridge County – north
Amherst County – northeast
Lynchburg, Virginia – east (independent city)
Campbell County – southeast
Pittsylvania County – south
Franklin County – southwest
Roanoke County – west
Botetourt County – northwest

National protected areas
 Blue Ridge Parkway (part)
 Jefferson National Forest (part)
 James River Face Wilderness (part)

State Park
 Smith Mountain Lake State Park

Major highways

Demographics

2020 census

Note: the US Census treats Hispanic/Latino as an ethnic category. This table excludes Latinos from the racial categories and assigns them to a separate category. Hispanics/Latinos can be of any race.

2000 Census
As of the census of 2000, there were 60,371 people, 23,838 households, and 18,164 families residing in the county.  The population density was 80 people per square mile (31/km2).  There were 26,841 housing units at an average density of 36 per square mile (14/km2).  The racial makeup of the county was 92.18% White, 6.24% Black or African American, 0.20% Native American, 0.43% Asian, 0.01% Pacific Islander, 0.20% from other races, and 0.74% from two or more races.  0.74% of the population were Hispanic or Latino of any race. 28.2% were of American, 15.6% English, 11.0% German and 9.6% Irish ancestry according to Census 2000.

There were 23,838 households, out of which 32.50% had children under the age of 18 living with them, 65.40% were married couples living together, 7.50% had a female householder with no husband present, and 23.80% were non-families. 20.20% of all households were made up of individuals, and 7.30% had someone living alone who was 65 years of age or older.  The average household size was 2.52 and the average family size was 2.89.

In the county, the population's age distribution was: 24.00% under the age of 18, 5.80% from 18 to 24, 29.90% from 25 to 44, 27.50% from 45 to 64, and 12.80% who were 65 years of age or older.  The median age was 40 years. For every 100 females there were 99.50 males.  For every 100 females age 18 and over, there were 97.50 males.

The median income for a household in the county was $43,136, and the median income for a family was $49,303. Males had a median income of $35,117 versus $23,906 for females. The per capita income for the county was $21,582.  About 5.20% of families and 7.10% of the population were below the poverty line, including 8.30% of those under age 18 and 10.50% of those age 65 or over.

2017

As of 2017, the largest self-reported ancestry groups were:

 English - 16.5%
 American - 14.3%
 German - 13.3%
 Irish - 11.3%
 Italian - 3.0%
 Scots-Irish - 2.7%
 Scottish - 2.6%

Government

Board of Supervisors
District 1: Mickey M. Johnson (R)
District 2: Edgar Tuck, Chair (I)
District 3: Charla Bansley (R)
District 4: John Sharp, (R)
District 5: Tommy W. Scott (R)
District 6: Bob W. Davis (R)
District 7: Tamara F. "Tammy" Parker, Vice Chair (R)

Constitutional officers
Clerk of the Circuit Court: Judy Reynolds (R)
Commissioner of the Revenue: Tracy Patterson (R)
Commonwealth's Attorney: Wes Nance (R)
Sheriff: Michael Miller (R)
Treasurer: Kim Snow (R)

Bedford County is represented by  Republicans David R. Suetterlein (19th District) and Stephen D. "Steve" Newman (23rd District) in the Virginia Senate; Republicans Terry L. Austin (19th District), Kathy J. Byron (22nd District) and Wendell S. Walker (23rd District) in the Virginia House of Delegates; and Republicans Bob Good (VA 5th District), Ben Cline (VA 6th District) in the U.S. House of Representatives, and Morgan Griffith (VA 9th District) in the U.S. House of Representatives.

Economy 
Historically, Bedford County was an agricultural economy. While agriculture is still an important factor in the county's economy, Bedford County has significant residential development to serve Lynchburg, Roanoke, and Smith Mountain Lake. Tourism and retail are also becoming more significant with some new industry near Forest and New London.

Politics 
Bedford voted for George Wallace, an Independent, for President in 1968.

Attractions 
Beale ciphers, the key to a supposed treasure buried somewhere in the county and which has attracted treasure hunters since the 19th century
National D-Day Memorial
Peaks of Otter
Poplar Forest
Smith Mountain Lake
Bedford Museum & Genealogical Library

Communities

Town
Bedford

Census-designated places
Big Island
Forest
Moneta
Montvale
Stewartsville

Other unincorporated communities

Chamblissburg
Coleman Falls
Goode
Goodview
Hardy
Huddleston
New London
Thaxton

Some of these unincorporated areas have mailing addresses in Bedford town and Lynchburg.

Notable people
 Nicholas H. Cobbs (1796-1861), former Episcopal prelate, served as the first Bishop of Alabama.
 Colonel Chaffin (1826 – April 1873),  little person who toured the United States and was billed as the "Virginia Dwarf".
 Erik Estrada (born March 16, 1949), an American actor, voice actor, and subsequent Bedford County deputy sheriff, known for his co-starring lead role in the police drama television series, CHiPs, which ran from 1977 to 1983.
 Carl Overstreet, (1929-2015) first U2 pilot to fly over Soviet Air Space 
 Thomas Jefferson had a summer retreat in Bedford County called "Poplar Forest".
 James P. Ownby (1845–1906), Illinois state representative; was born in Bedford County.  
 Lacey Putney was born and raised in Bedford County, VA.
 Jerry Falwell Jr, former Liberty University President, lives in Bedford County on a farm.
 Sam Sloan, book publisher, lives in Bedford County and attended Boonsboro School Elementary School and High School in Bedford County

See also
National Register of Historic Places listings in Bedford County, Virginia
Bedford Public Library System

References

External links

Bedford Area Chamber of Commerce's website
Bedford County government's website 

 
Virginia counties
1754 establishments in Virginia
Counties on the James River (Virginia)
Populated places established in 1754